Rhodocosmaria is a genus of moths belonging to the subfamily Olethreutinae of the family Tortricidae.

Species
Rhodocosmaria occidentalis Diakonoff, 1973
Rhodocosmaria operosa (Meyrick, 1911)

See also
List of Tortricidae genera

References

External links
Tortricid.net

Tortricidae genera
Olethreutinae
Taxa named by Alexey Diakonoff